Portrait of Elisabeth of Valois is a c.1561-1565 oil on canvas painting by Sofonisba Anguissola, now in the Museo del Prado in Madrid.

It shows Elisabeth of Valois, third wife of Philip II of Spain. Its iconography derives from Titian's Portrait of Elizabeth of Portugal, Philip's mother. Elisabeth is shown holding a miniature of Philip in her right hand, whilst her black clothing testifies to the austerity of the Spanish court at that time.

References

Paintings of the Museo del Prado by Italian artists
1565 paintings
Elisabeth
Elisabeth